Soğan kebabı (Onion kebab) is a Turkish kebab dish made with ground lamb kofte baked inside sliced onions, peppers and pomegranate sauce. 

The dish comes from the Gaziantep region of Southern Turkey, close to the Syrian border. It is considered to be a winter recipe, with onion being good for protecting against illnesses.

See also
 List of kebabs

References

Turkish cuisine
Lamb dishes
Mediterranean cuisine
Middle Eastern cuisine
Turkish words and phrases
Kebabs
Gaziantep
Baked foods